Geishöhe (German for goat height) is a 521 meter tall hill of Bavaria, Germany in the Mittelgebirge Spessart. 

Oberwinterbach, a hamlet which ist part of the municipality Dammbach, lies on the plateau at the top of the hill. It is the permanently inhabited location with the highest elevation in the Spessart.

60 steps lead to a viewing platform with panoramic view of Spessart, Odenwald, Taunus and Rhön. It is named after the former chairman of the Spessartbund Ludwig Keller (1873 to 1932). Four marked hiking trails meet at the tower.

The lookout tower is used by amateur radio operators due to its exposed location. 
100 meters east of the lookout tower rises a 35 meter high steel lattice mast with the antennas for the Geishöhe transmit and receive system.

Hills of Bavaria
Aschaffenburg (district)